Philautus acutirostris is a species of frog in the family Rhacophoridae.
It is endemic to the Philippines. Its natural habitats are subtropical or tropical moist lowland forests and subtropical or tropical moist montane forests.
It is threatened by habitat loss.

References

acutirostris
Amphibians of the Philippines
Amphibians described in 1867
Taxa named by Wilhelm Peters
Taxonomy articles created by Polbot